Events in the year 2023 in Vatican City.

Incumbents 
 Sovereign Pontiff (Pope): Pope Francis
 Cardinal Secretary of State: Pietro Parolin
 President of the Pontifical Commission: Fernando Vérgez Alzaga

Events 

 5 January – The funeral for Pope emeritus Benedict XVI takes place in St. Peter's Square, Vatican City, with at least 100,000 attendees.

Scheduled 
 10 October – Sixteenth Ordinary General Assembly of the Synod of Bishops

See also 

 Roman Catholic Church
 COVID-19 pandemic in Europe
 2023 in Europe
 City states

References 

 
Vatican City
Vatican City
2020s in Vatican City
Years of the 21st century in Vatican City